

Systematics 
Physaloptera is a genus of parasitic nematodes in the family Physalopteridae. Species include:
Physaloptera dilatata
Physaloptera dispar
Physaloptera hispida
Physaloptera losseni
Physaloptera maxillaris
Physaloptera murisbrasiliensis
Physaloptera ngoci 
Physaloptera preputialis
Physaloptera retusa
Physaloptera rara

Undescribed or unidentified species have been found on the hispid cotton rat (Sigmodon hispidus) in the southern United States, the marsh rice rat (Oryzomys palustris) in Florida, and Leontopithecus rosalia, Physalaemus soaresi, Cacajao calvus, and Lagothrix lagotricha in Brazil.

Physaloptera spp. as human parasites 

Most species utilize insects such as crickets, cockroaches, and beetles as intermediate hosts. Several species of Physaloptera can be parasites of primates and man. This rare disease is known as spiruridiasis.
Human infection is considered to be ancient; eggs of Physaloptera sp. were found in a grave of the Bronze Age in Iran.

References

Literature cited 

Kinsella, J.M. 1988. Comparison of helminths of rice rats, Oryzomys palustris, from freshwater and saltwater marshes in Florida. Proceedings of the Helminthological Society of Washington 55(2):275–280.

Spirurida